Aliabad-e Rugushuiyeh (also Romanized as ʿAlīābād-e Rūgūshū’īyeh) is a village in Jowzam Rural District, Dehaj District, Shahr-e Babak County, Kerman Province, Iran. At the 2006 census, its population was 26, in 6 families.

References 

Populated places in Shahr-e Babak County